Cameron Deane Stewart (born April 8, 1991) is an American actor. He is known for his roles in the films Geography Club, Pitch Perfect, and Dirty Teacher as well as his role as Steven in the television teen sitcom iCarly.

Career

Cameron played the role of Steven in iCarly and Victorious'''s special, iParty with Victorious in 2011. In 2013, he has gained more attention from his leading role as Russell, a closeted gay teen who joins his high school football team, in Geography Club.  He went on to star as Tom in Pitch Perfect. He had a recurring role as Jace in the Disney Channel sitcom Austin & Ally'' as well as several other television series.

Filmography

References

External links
 

1991 births
20th-century American male actors
21st-century American male actors
American male film actors
American male television actors
Living people
Male actors from Orange County, California